Phenylisobutylamine, also known as α-ethylphenethylamine, Butanphenamine, B or AEPEA, is a stimulant drug of the phenethylamine class. It is a higher homologue of amphetamine, differing from amphetamine's molecular structure only by the substitution of the methyl group at the alpha position of the side chain with an ethyl group. Compared to amphetamine, phenylisobutylamine has strongly reduced dopaminergic effects, and instead acts as a selective norepinephrine releasing agent. The dextroisomer of phenylisobutylamine partially substitutes for dextroamphetamine in rats.

A number of derivatives of phenylisobutylamine are known, including BDB, MBDB, EBDB, butylone (βk-MBDB), eutylone (βk-EBDB), Ariadne (α-Et-DOM), 4-CAB, and 4-MAB.

"Phenylisobutylamine" is in fact a chemical misnomer because isobutylamine itself contains a branched chain. The correct name after this style for this class of compound would be "phenylsecbutylamine".

See also 
 Phenethylamine
 Amphetamine
 N,alpha-diethylphenylethylamine

References 

Norepinephrine releasing agents